Tyler Legacy High School, previously known as Robert E. Lee High School, is one of two Tyler Independent School District high school campuses in the city of Tyler, Texas, the other being Tyler High School. Tyler Legacy High School has served the East Texas community since opening in 2020 and classified as a 6A school by the UIL. In 2013, the school was rated "Met Standard" by the Texas Education Agency.

History

There was a debate in the Tyler community in 2017–2018 on whether the school's name should change, as Robert E. Lee became a controversial figure even among White people. In 2018 the district's board decided not to vote on a possible renaming, so the school kept its name. On July 16, 2020 the school board voted unanimously to initiate changing the name of both Robert E. Lee High School and John Tyler High School.

Tradition

In the 1960s, when Lee's mascot was the Rebel, the school was famous for its working cannon and oversized Confederate flag. A group of seniors tended the cannon at games, firing it when the Rebel football team scored a touchdown. The football team entered Rose Stadium by running under the flag, reputed to be the second largest Confederate flag in the world (second only to one owned by the University of Mississippi). By 1972, the flag was retired and its whereabouts are unknown. The flag was retired shortly after four African-American players refused to run under the flag and ran around it instead, causing some local controversy. The cannon, retired in 1986, is now the property of Brook Hill School in Bullard, Texas.

Demographics
As of the 2020-21 school year, the student body consisted of: 
38.2% White (Non-Hispanic)
27.6% African American
27.2% Hispanic
3.0% Asian
0.3% Native American
0.1% Pacific Islander
3.6% Two or More Races

Education
Tyler Legacy High School offers a variety of pre-AP and AP-level courses, as well as career technology education programs and fine arts electives. The school implemented an international baccalaureate program in the fall of 2008.

Athletics
As of 2014, Tyler Legacy High School is classified as a 6A school in District 11 along with many Garland and Rockwall Schools. Tyler Legacy Red Raiders compete in a variety of sports including baseball, basketball, golf, soccer, softball, volleyball, tennis, powerlifting, track, swimming, cross country and is most well known for the Tyler football team.

State titles
Football 
2004(5A/D1) - Defeated Spring Westfield 28-21 at the Alamodome in San Antonio, Texas
Boys Golf 
1959(3A)
Team Tennis 
1987(5A), 1988(5A)

Notable alumni

Steve Breedlove, Anglican bishop
Sandy Duncan, Class of 1965, actress
Holland Lee Hendrix, Class of 1966, biblical scholar and late president of Union Theological Seminary (New York City)
Alex Finlayson, Class of 1969, playwright and journalist
Dale Dudley, Class of 1979, radio personality (Dudley and Bob) at KLBJ-FM Austin, Texas, Film Actor, Magazine Columnist.
Corey Mayfield, Class of 1988, 3yr Starter at Oklahoma, San Fran 49r's, Tampa Bay Buccaneers and Jacksonville Jaguars.
Fred Coleman, wide receiver for the New England Patriots
Joffrey Reynolds, Class of 1997, running back for the Calgary Stampeders
Matt Flynn, Class of 2003, quarterback for the Green Bay Packers
Brandon Pettigrew, Class of 2004, tight end for the Detroit Lions
Ciron Black, Class of 2005, former tackle for the Louisiana State University Tigers
Burch Smith, Major League Baseball player for the San Francisco Giants

References

External links
Robert E. Lee High School

Educational institutions established in 1958
High schools in Tyler, Texas
1958 establishments in Texas
Public high schools in Texas
Schools in Smith County, Texas
Name changes due to the George Floyd protests